Polepy is name of several locations in the Czech Republic:
Polepy (Kolín District)
Polepy (Litoměřice District)